The Peugeot Type 163 and associated models were produced from 1919 to 1924 by Peugeot. The car's engine placed it in the 10CV class.

Background
Peugeot returned to passenger car production after the war slightly less rapidly than Paris based Renault and Citroën, both of which were quick off the mark with new entrants in the 10HP class.   Peugeot's 159 was very much a stopgap solution, and the Type 163, prepared during the summer of 1919, was a much more modern contender.

Models
In 1922 the manufacturer added the Type 163 BS, a sportier model with less weight, an uprated 1.5 L (1480 cc) engine Four-Wheels drive, and a longer  wheelbase. In 1923 came the Type 163 BR, which carried over most of the mechanicals from Type 163 BS, but was heavier and slower. Total production came to 11,925.



References
 
Peugeot Car Models from 1910 to 1949
Peugeot Type 163 at Histomobile
Peugeot Type 163 BS at Histomobile
Peugeot Type 163 BR at Histomobile

Type 163
Cars introduced in 1919
1920s cars